Santa Giusta is a comune (municipality) in the Province of Oristano in the Italian region of Sardinia, located about  northwest of Cagliari and about  southeast of Oristano in the Campidano area.

History
The site of the Phoenician port town of Othoca is thought to be at the bottom of a lake separated from the Mediterranean by a small isthmus, and modern Santa Giusta occupies some ancient sites. Previous excavations recovered 50 amphorae and the first chamber tomb of Phoenician origin found in Italy. Archaeologists led by Carlo del Vais of the University of Cagliari plan to excavate a portion of the lake where 100 amphorae appear to be located on a wooden platform covered by a thick mud layer.

Main sights
Santa Giusta Cathedral, former cathedral and now a minor basilica, an important Romanesque church

References

Cities and towns in Sardinia
Populated places established in the 8th century BC